Birchbox is a New York City-based online monthly subscription service that sends its subscribers a box of four to five selected samples of makeup, or other beauty related products. The products include skincare items, perfumes, organic based products, and various other cosmetics.

History
Birchbox was established in September 2010 by Katia Beauchamp and Hayley Barna, both graduates of Harvard Business School.  In October 2010, Birchbox's initial funding began with $1.4 million in seed funding from investors including First Round and Accel Partners.

In August 2011, Birchbox received $10.5 million in Series A Funding. 

In April 2014, Birchbox raised $60 million in Series B funding, led by Viking Global Investors, and saw participation from First Round Capital, Accel Partners, Aspect Partners, and Consigliere Brand Capital. In July 2014, Birchbox opened its first brick-and-mortar store in New York's Soho neighborhood. As of 2014, the company was valued at $485 million. In October, Birchbox partnered with Soldsie to launch its first Instagram shop. The shop allows Instagram users interested in Birchbox products to purchase directly through Instagram by leaving a comment on a photo with the hashtag #birchboxcart.

In 2015, co-founder Hayley Barna stepped down from the co-CEO role at the company and joined the First Round Capital firm as a venture partner. In January 2016, the company cut 15% of its staff. 

As of May 2018, it had raised a total of almost $90 million in funding. In October, a minority stake in Birchbox was purchased by Walgreens, with Birchbox to open in Walgreens stores, initially 11.

As of May 2019, Birchbox had 230 employees. 

In January 2020, the company cut 70% of its staff.

In October 2021, Birchbox has been acquired by FemTec (A health start-up) for $ 45,000,000 USD.

Business
As of Jan 2021, Birchbox has 300 thousand subscribers and 500 thousand active customers. Birchbox's incentive is that the consumer will choose to purchase the full-sized product of whatever sample they've grown to like from the Birchbox website afterward. As of 2021, about 5% of box subscribers went on to make full-size purchases.

After subscribing, the customer takes a survey called a "beauty profile" that aims to customize their future selections to better suit their preferences.

See also
 Online Retail

References

External links

Cosmetics companies of the United States
Subscription services